The Brantford Eagles were a Canadian junior ice hockey team based in Brantford, Ontario, Canada.  They played in the Mid-Western Conference of the Greater Ontario Junior Hockey League.

On May 23, 2012, the Eagles were transplanted to Caledonia, Ontario, and renamed the Caledonia Corvairs, the name of the long-running Junior C team in the town.

History
In 1967, the Brantford Majors were a member of the Niagara Junior "B" League. In 1968, a second Brantford team, by the name of the Foresters, joined the renegade Western Junior "B" League.  The Foresters absorbed by the Majors in 1970 when the Majors joined the Southern Ontario Junior A Hockey League.  The Majors folded in 1972.

In 1973, the Diamond Kings entered the Southwestern Junior "B" League. In 1974, an additional junior team was created in Brantford at the "C" level.  When the Kings folded, the Penguins jumped up to Junior "B" to take their place.  The Brantford Junior "B" franchise spent most of their early days in the Golden Horseshoe Junior B Hockey League.  The Penguins originated in the Central Junior C Hockey League before jumping to the Southwestern Ontario Junior "B" before taking their place, as well, in the GHJHL.

In 1986, the Ontario Hockey Association, concerned with elevating violence in the game, banned the Brantford Classics and the Streetsville Derbys and both teams' management for at least one season.

Since 1987 the Brantford Eagles in one way or another have stayed the course with the Midwestern "B".  Despite various name changes and a couple minor moves, the Eagles have been a charter member of the league for almost 20 years.

Season-by-season results

Majors, Selects, Kings

Playoffs
 1971 DNQ
 1972 DNQ

Foresters

Playoffs
 1969 Lost Final
Brantford Foresters defeated Guelph Imperials 4-games-to-1
St. Thomas Barons defeated Brantford Foresters 4-games-to-none
 1970 Lost Final
Brantford Foresters defeated Guelph Beef Kings 4-games-to-none
Chatham Maroons defeated Brantford Foresters 5-games-to-2

Sutherland Cup appearances
2009: Brantford Eagles defeated Stoney Creek Warriors 4-games-to-1
2010: LaSalle Vipers defeated Brantford Eagles 4-games-to-1
2012: St. Catharines Falcons defeated Brantford Eagles 4-games-to-2

George S. Dudley Trophy Super "C" appearances
1976: Woodstock Navy-Vets defeated Brantford Penguins 4-games-to-none

Notable alumni
This list includes only National Hockey League alumni.
Rob Blake
Chris Gratton
Brent Gretzky
Adam Mair
Adam Munro
Paul Szczechura

References

External links
 

Ice hockey teams in Ontario
Sport in Brantford
1970 establishments in Ontario
2012 disestablishments in Ontario
Ice hockey clubs established in 1970
Sports clubs disestablished in 2012